The 1968 Football Championship of Ukrainian SSR (Class B) was the 38th season of association football competition of the Ukrainian SSR, which was part of the Ukrainian Class B. It was the eighteenth in the Soviet Class B and the sixth season of the Ukrainian Class B. 

The 1968 Football Championship of Ukrainian SSR (Class B) was won by FC Avanhard Ternopil.

Zone 1 (West)

Location map

Relegated teams
 none

Promoted teams
 FC Prohres Berdychiv
 FC Karpaty Mukacheve – (the Ukrainian KFK competitions)
 FC Nistrul Bendery – (Champion of the Moldavian KFK competitions)
 FC Shakhtar Chervonohrad
 FC Shakhtar Novovolynsk
 FC Podillia Kamianets-Podilskyi – (the Ukrainian KFK competitions)

Relocated and renamed teams
 FC Torpedo Lutsk previously known as FC Volyn Lutsk
 FC Stroiindustriya Beltsy previously known as FC Stroitel Beltsy
 FC Dnestr Tiraspol previously known as FC Energiya Tiraspol

Final standings

Zone 2

Location map

Relegated teams
 none

Promoted teams
 FC Avanhard Rovenky – (Champion of the Ukrainian KFK competitions)
 FC Ugolyok Krasnoarmiysk
 FC Shakhtar Sverdlovsk

Relocated and renamed teams
 FC Lokomotyv Dnipropetrovsk previously known as FC Stal Dnipropetrovsk
 FC Industriya Yenakieve previously known as FC Shakhtar Yenakieve

Final standings

Final stage

See also
 Soviet Second League

External links
 1969 season regulations.  Luhansk football portal
 1969 Soviet championships (all leagues) at helmsoccer.narod.ru

1968
3
Soviet
Soviet
class B
1968 in Moldovan football
Football Championship of the Ukrainian SSR